Marco Montelatici (born 25 August 1953 in Florence) is a former shot putter from Italy.

Biography
He competed for his native country at the 1984 Summer Olympics in Los Angeles, California, finishing in 6th place. Montelatici set his shot put personal best (20.90 metres) in the international event "Pasqua dell'Atleta" in 1985, improving the Italian national record set in 1979 by Bruno Pauletto.

Achievements

National championships
Marco Montelatici has won 10 times the individual national championship.
5 wins in the shot put (1976, 1977, 1982, 1987, 1988)
5 wins in the shot put indoor (1973, 1977, 1978, 1984, 1986)

See also
 Italian all-time lists - Shot put
 Italy national athletics team - More caps

References

External links
 

1953 births
Living people
Italian male shot putters
Athletes (track and field) at the 1984 Summer Olympics
Olympic athletes of Italy
Sportspeople from Florence